Russert may be:

Tim Russert (1950-2008), American journalist
Luke Russert (born 1985), American journalist, son of Tim
Megan Russert, fictional Baltimore homicide detective (and fictionally a relative of the real Tim Russert)